Conus ventricosus, common name the Mediterranean cone, is a species of sea snail, a marine gastropod mollusk in the family Conidae, the cone snails and their allies.

 Conus ventricosus mediterraneus Hwass in Bruguière, 1792, is a recognized subspecies.

Like all species within the genus Conus, these snails are predatory and venomous. They are capable of "stinging" humans, therefore live ones should be handled carefully or not at all.

Description
The size of the shell varies between 13 mm and 63 mm. The shell is yellowish brown, pink-brown or olivaceous. It is sometimes chocolate-brown, very closely nebulously spotted and reticulated. And sometimes it is interrupted-lined with chestnut, with a narrow, light band below the middle. The spire is elevated, rudely gradate and maculated. The interior of the aperture is light chocolate, with a light band.

The peptide Contryphan-Vn was extracted from the venom of this marine snail. It is part of a complex mixture of poisonous compounds secreted by this cone snailand used in worm hunting.

Distribution
This marine species has a wide distribution found in shallow waters ranging in the Mediterranean Sea.

It was also found as a fossil from the Pliocene and the Miocene.

List of synonyms
 
 Conus (Lautoconus) ventricosus Gmelin, 1791 · accepted, alternate representation
 Conus adansonii Lamarck, 1810
 Conus adriaticus Nardo, 1847
 Conus amazonicus Nardo, 1847
 Conus caillaudi Jay, 1846
 Conus chersoideus Nardo, 1847
 Conus cinctus Bosc, 1801
 Conus clodianus Nardo, 1847
 Conus cretheus Nardo, 1847
 Conus epaphus Nardo, 1847
 Conus epaticus Renier, 1804 (unavailable name: published in a work placed on the Official Index of Invalid and Rejected Specific Names in Zoology by ICZN Opinion 316)
 Conus errosus Renier, 1804 (unavailable name: published in a work placed on the Official Index of Invalid and Rejected Specific Names in Zoology by ICZN Opinion 316)
 Conus fortis Renier, 1804 (unavailable name: published in a work placed on the Official Index of Invalid and Rejected Specific Names in Zoology by ICZN Opinion 316)
 Conus franciscanus Bruguière, 1792
 Conus galloprovincialis Locard, 1886
 Conus galloprovincialis var. lineolata Locard & Caziot, 1900 (invalid: junior homonym of Conus lineolatus Valenciennes, 1832)
 Conus galloprovincialis var. minor Locard & Caziot, 1900 (invalid: junior homonym of Conus ventricosus var. minor Monterosato, 1878)
 Conus galloprovincialis var. producta Coen, 1933
 Conus galloprovincialis var. turrita Coen, 1933
 Conus glaucescens G. B. Sowerby I, 1834
 Conus grossii Maravigna, 1853 (synonym)
 Conus guestieri Lorois, 1860
 Conus hanleyi G. B. Sowerby II, 1857 Conus hanley AZRC 547-34a Conus hanley AZRC 548-34b
 Conus herillus Nardo, 1847
 Conus humilis von Salis Marschlins, 1793
 Conus ignobilis Olivi, 1792 (synonym)
 Conus ignobilis var. rufa Scacchi, 1836
 Conus inaequalis Reeve, 1849
 Conus intermedius Lamarck, 1810 - fossil
 Conus istriensis Nardo, 1847
 Conus jamaicensis Hwass in Bruguière, 1792
 Conus jaspis Salis Marschlins, 1793 (synonym)
 Conus listeri Renier, 1804 (unavailable name: published in a work placed on the Official Index of Invalid and Rejected Specific Names in Zoology by ICZN Opinion 316)
 Conus madurensis Hwass in Bruguière, 1792
 Conus mediterraneus Hwass in Bruguière, 1792
 Conus mediterraneus f. gaudiosus Nicolay, 1978 (unavailable name: established as a "form" after 1960)
 Conus mediterraneus var. acuta Requien, 1848
 Conus mediterraneus var. alalmus de Gregorio, 1885
 Conus mediterraneus var. alba Coen, 1933 (invalid: junior homonym of Conus virgo alba Spalowsky, 1795)
 Conus mediterraneus var. albina Bucquoy, Dautzenberg & Dollfus, 1882
 Conus mediterraneus var. alticonica Pallary, 1904 (synonym)
 Conus mediterraneus var. amigus de Gregorio, 1885
 Conus mediterraneus var. arenaria Monterosato, 1917
 Conus mediterraneus var. ater Philippi, 1836
 Conus mediterraneus var. atra Philippi, 1844 
 Conus mediterraneus var. caerulescens Bucquoy, Dautzenberg & Dollfus, 1883
  Conus mediterraneus var. carinata Bucquoy, Dautzenberg & Dollfus, 1884 (invalid: junior homonym of Conus carinatus Swainson, 1822)
  Conus mediterraneus var. castanea Coen, 1933
  Conus mediterraneus var. debilis Monterosato, 1917
  Conus mediterraneus var. elongata Bucquoy, Dautzenberg & Dollfus, 1885
  Conus mediterraneus var. emisus de Gregorio, 1885
  Conus mediterraneus var. fasciata Requien, 1848 (invalid: junior homonym of Conus fasciatus Schröter, 1803, and several others)
  Conus mediterraneus var. flammulata Bucquoy, Dautzenberg & Dollfus, 1882
  Conus mediterraneus var. flavescens Coen, 1933 (invalid: junior homonym of Conus flavescens G.B. Sowerby I, 1834)
  Conus mediterraneus var. fusca Bucquoy, Dautzenberg & Dollfus, 1882
  Conus mediterraneus var. interrupta Coen, 1933 (invalid: junior homonym of Conus interruptus Wood, 1828)
  Conus mediterraneus var. lutea Bucquoy, Dautzenberg & Dollfus, 1882 (invalid: junior homonym of Conus luteus G.B. Sowerby I, 1833)
  Conus mediterraneus var. major Bucquoy, Dautzenberg & Dollfus, 1882
  Conus mediterraneus var. marmoratus Philippi, 1836 (invalid: junior homonym of Conus marmoratus Holten, 1802)
  Conus mediterraneus var. minor Monterosato, 1878
  Conus mediterraneus var. oblonga Bucquoy, Dautzenberg & Dollfus, 1882
  Conus mediterraneus var. obtusa Requien, 1848
  Conus mediterraneus var. pallida Bucquoy, Dautzenberg & Dollfus, 1882
  Conus mediterraneus var. persistens Kobelt, 1906
  Conus mediterraneus var. pretunculus Monterosato, 1917
  Conus mediterraneus var. rubens Bucquoy, Dautzenberg & Dollfus, 1882
  Conus mediterraneus var. rufatra de Gregorio, 1885
  Conus mediterraneus var. scalare Dautzenberg, 1911 (invalid: junior homonym of Conus scalaris Valenciennes, 1832)
  Conus mediterraneus var. scalaris Pallary, 1912 (invalid: junior homonym of Conus scalaris Valenciennes, 1832)
  Conus mediterraneus var. subconcolor Requien, 1848
  Conus mediterraneus var. subviridis de Gregorio, 1885
 Conus olivaceus Salis Marschlins, 1793 (synonym)
 Conus olivaceus Kiener, 1850 (invalid: junior homonym of Conus olivaceus Salis, 1793)
 Conus pallans Nardo, 1847
 Conus phegeus Nardo, 1847
 Conus postdiluvianus Risso, 1826
 Conus rusticus Poli, 1826 (invalid: junior homonym of Conus rusticus Linnaeus, 1758)
 Conus siculus Delle Chiaje, 1828
 Conus stercutius Nardo, 1847
 Conus submediterraneus Locard, 1886 
 Conus thuscus Nardo, 1847
 Conus trunculus Monterosato, 1899
 Conus vayssierei var. ossea Monterosato, 1917
 Conus ventricosus mediterraneus Hwass in Bruguière, 1792
 Conus ventricosus var. elpus de Gregorio, 1885
 Conus ventricosus var. empismus de Gregorio, 1885
 Conus ventricosus var. pereirae de Gregorio, 1885
 Conus zealandicus Hutton, 1873
 Cucullus annulas Noodt, 1819
 Cucullus glaucus Röding, 1798
 Lautoconus mediterraneus (Hwass in Bruguière, 1792)
 Lautoconus mediterraneus var. noeformis Monterosato, 1923
 Lautoconus ventricosus (Gmelin, 1791)

References

 Gmelin, J.F. (1791) Vermes. In Gmelin J.F. (Ed.) Caroli a Linnaei Systema Naturae per Regna Tria Naturae, Editio Decima Tertia, Aucta Reformata. Tome 1, Pars 6 (Vermes). G.E. Beer, Lipsiae [Leipzig], pp. 3021-3910
 Olivi G., 1792: Zoologia Adriatica, ossia catalogo ragionato degli animali del golfo e della lagune di Venezia Bassano, Venecia [ix] + 334 + xxxii pp., 9 pls
  Bruguière J.G., 1789–1792: Encyclopédie méthodique. Histoire naturelle des vers.; Panckoucke, Paris Vol. 1: 1–344 [June 1789]. Vol. 2: 345–758 [13 feb 1792], dates after N. EVENHUIS, 2003, Zootaxa, 166: 37; Zootaxa, 207]. Atlas pl. 1–189 [1791] pl. 190–286 [1797] pl. 287–390 [1798] pl. 391–488 [1816: tavole curate da Deshayes] 
  Salis Marschlins C. U. von, 1793 : Reisen in verschieden Provinzen den Königreischs Neapel; Zurich and Leipzig, Ziegler Vol. I: pp. 442 + 10 pl. 
 Philippi R. A., 1844: Enumeratio molluscorum Siciliae cum viventium tum in tellure tertiaria fossilium, quae in itinere suo observavit. Vol. 2; Eduard Anton, Halle [Halis Saxorum] iv + 303 p., pl. 13–28 
  Maravigna C., 1853: Descrizione di alcune nuove o poco conosciute specie di conchiglie siciliane; Atti dell'Accademia Gioenia di Scienze Naturali (2) 8: 121–140
  Locard A., 1886 : Prodrome de malacologie française. Catalogue général des mollusques vivants de France. Mollusque marins; Lyon, H. Georg & Paris, Baillière pp. X + 778
  Monterosato T. A. (di), 1899 (26 dicembre): Coquilles marines de Chypre ; Journal de Conchyliologie 47 (4): 392–401
  Pallary P., 1904–1906: Addition à la faune malacologique du Golfe de Gabès; Journal de Conchyliologie 52: 212–248, pl. 7; 54: 77–124, pl. 4
  Pallary P., 1912c : Sur la faune de l'ancienne lagune de Tunis; Bulletin de la Société d'Histoire Naturelle de l'Afrique du Nord 4(9): 215–228 
 Filmer R.M. 2001. A Catalogue of Nomenclature and Taxonomy in the Living Conidae 1758 - 1998. Backhuys Publishers, Leiden. 388pp.
 Tucker J.K. 2009. Recent cone species database. 4 September 2009 Edition.
   Le Granché Philippe, Damerval Marc, in : Doris, 11/2/2013 : Conus ventricosus Gmelin, 1791

External links
 The Conus Biodiversity website
 
 Cone Shells – Knights of the Sea
 Lectotype in MNHN, Paris

ventricosus
Gastropods described in 1791
Taxa named by Johann Friedrich Gmelin